Inka Wesely is a German former football defender.

As an Under-19 international she won the 2010 U-20 World Cup.

Honours 

1. FFC Turbine Potsdam
 Bundesliga: Winner 2011, 2012

International
 FIFA U-20 Women's World Cup: Winner 2010
 UEFA Women's Under-17 Championship: Winner 2008
 FIFA U-17 Women's World Cup Third place 2008

References

1991 births
Living people
1. FFC Turbine Potsdam players
SGS Essen players
German women's footballers
Women's association football defenders
People from Wesel
Sportspeople from Düsseldorf (region)
Footballers from North Rhine-Westphalia